Darou Minam is an arrondissement of Malem Hodar in Kaffrine Region in Senegal.

References 

Arrondissements of Senegal